Cross-dressing is the act of wearing clothes traditionally or stereotypically associated with a different gender. From as early as pre-modern history, cross-dressing has been practiced in order to disguise, comfort, entertain, and express oneself.

Almost every human society throughout history has had expected norms for each gender relating to style, color, or type of clothing they are expected to wear, and likewise most societies have had a set of guidelines, views or even laws defining what type of clothing is appropriate for each gender. Therefore, cross-dressing allows individuals to express themselves by acting beyond guidelines, views, or even laws defining what type of clothing is expected and appropriate for each gender.

The term "cross-dressing" refers to an action or a behavior, without attributing or implying any specific causes or motives for that behavior. Cross-dressing is not synonymous with being transgender.

Terminology
The phenomenon of cross-dressing is seen throughout recorded history, being referred to as far back as the Hebrew Bible. The terms used to describe it have changed throughout history; the Anglo-Saxon-rooted term "cross-dresser" is viewed more favorably than the Latin-origin term "transvestite" in some circles, where it has come to be seen as outdated and derogatory.  Its first mention originated in Magnus Hirschfeld’s Die of Transvestiten (The Transvestites) in 1910, originally associating cross-dressing with non-heterosexual behavior or derivations of sexual intent. Its connotations largely changed in the 20th century as its use was more frequently associated with sexual excitement, otherwise known as transvestic disorder. This term was historically used to diagnose psychiatric disorders (e.g. transvestic fetishism), but the former (cross-dressing) was coined by the transgender community. The Oxford English Dictionary gives 1911 as the earliest citation of the term "cross-dressing", by Edward Carpenter: "Cross-dressing must be taken as a general indication of, and a cognate phenomenon to, homosexuality". In 1928, Havelock Ellis used the two terms "cross-dressing" and "transvestism" interchangeably. The earliest citations for "cross-dress" and "cross-dresser" are 1966 and 1976, respectively.

History

Non-Western History 

Cross-dressing has been practiced throughout much of recorded history, in many societies, and for many reasons. Examples exist in Greek, Norse, and Hindu mythology. Cross-dressing can be found in theater and religion, such as kabuki, Noh, and Korean shamanism, as well as in folklore, literature, and music. For instance, in examining kabuki culture during Japan’s edo period, cross-dressing was not only used for theater purposes but also because current societal trends: cross-dressing and the switching of genders was a familiar concept to the Japanese at the time which allowed them to interchange characters’s genders easily and incorporate geisha fashion into men’s wear. This was especially common in the story-telling of ancient stories such as the character Benten from Benten Kozō. He was a thief in the play cross-dressing as a woman. Cross-dressing was also exhibited in Japanese Noh for similar reasons. Societal standards at the time broke boundaries between gender. For example, ancient Japanese portraits of aristocrats have no clear differentiation in characteristics between male and female beauty. Thus, in Noh performance, the cross-dressing of actors was common; especially given the ease of disguising biological sex with the use of masks and heavy robes. In a non-entertainment context, cross-dressing is also exhibited in Korean shamanism for religious purposes. Specifically, this is displayed in chaesu-gut, a shamanistic rite gut in which a shaman offers a sacrifice to the spirits to intermediate in the fortunes of the intended humans for the gut. Here, cross-dressing serves many purposes. Firstly, the shaman (typically a woman) would cross-dress as both male and female spirits can occupy her. This allows her to represent the opposite sex and become a cross-sex icon in 75% of the time of the ritual. This also allows her to become a sexually liminal being. It's clear that in entertainment, literature, art, and religion, different civilizations have utilized cross-dressing for many different purposes.

Western History 
In the British and European context, theatrical troupes ("playing companies") were all-male, with the female parts undertaken by boy players.

The Rebecca Riots took place between 1839 and 1843 in West and Mid Wales. They were a series of protests undertaken by local farmers and agricultural workers in response to unfair taxation. The rioters, often men dressed as women, took their actions against toll-gates, as they were tangible representations of high taxes and tolls. The riots ceased prior to 1844 due to several factors, including increased troop levels, a desire by the protestors to avoid violence and the appearance of criminal groups using the guise of the biblical character Rebecca for their own purposes. In 1844 an Act of Parliament to consolidate and amend the laws relating to turnpike trusts in Wales was passed.

A variety of historical figures are known to have cross-dressed to varying degrees. Many women found they had to disguise themselves as men in order to participate in the wider world. For example, Margaret King cross-dressed in the early 19th century to attend medical school, as none would accept female students. A century later, Vita Sackville-West dressed as a young soldier in order to "walk out" with her girlfriend Violet Keppel, to avoid the street harassment that two women would have faced. The prohibition on women wearing male garb, once strictly applied, still has echoes today in some Western societies which require girls and women to wear skirts, for example as part of school uniform or office dress codes. In some countries, even in casual settings, women are still prohibited from wearing traditionally male clothing. Sometimes all trousers, no matter how loose and long, are automatically considered "indecent", which may render their wearer subject to severe punishment, as in the case of Lubna al-Hussein in Sudan in 2009.

Legal issues 

In many countries, cross-dressing was illegal under laws that identified it as indecent or immoral. Many such laws were challenged in the late 1900s giving people the right to freedom of gender expression with regard to their clothing.

For instance, from 1840 forward, United States saw state and city laws forbidding people from appearing in public while dressed in clothes that do not associate with their assigned sex. The goal of this wave of policies was to create a tool that would enforce a normative gender narrative, targeting multiple gender identities across the gender spectrum. With the progression of time, styles, and societal trends, it became even more difficult to draw the line between what was cross-dressing or not. Only recently have these laws changed. As recently as 2011, it was still possible for a man to get arrested for “impersonating a woman” — a vestige of the 19th century laws. Even with this, legal issues surrounding cross-dressing perpetuated all throughout the mid 20th century. During this time period, police would often reference laws that did not exist or laws that have been repealed in order to target the LGBTQ+ community.

This extends beyond the United States: There still remains 13 UN member States that explicitly criminalize transgender individuals, and there exist even more countries that use a great deal of diverse laws to target them. The third edition of the Trans Legal Mapping Report, done by the International Lesbian, Gay, Bisexual, Trans, and Intersex Association found that an especially common method to target these individuals is through cross-dressing regulations. For instance, only in 2014 did we see change in Malaysia as an appeal court finally overturned a state law prohibiting Muslim men from cross-dressing as women.

Varieties

There are many different kinds of cross-dressing and many different reasons why an individual might engage in cross-dressing behavior. Some people cross-dress as a matter of comfort or style, a personal preference for clothing associated with the opposite gender. Some people cross-dress to shock others or challenge social norms; others will limit their cross-dressing to underwear, so that it is not apparent. Some people attempt to pass as a member of the opposite gender in order to gain access to places or resources they would not otherwise be able to reach.

Gender disguise
Gender disguise has been used by women and girls to pass as male, and by men and boys to pass as female. Gender disguise has also been used as a plot device in storytelling, particularly in narrative ballads, and is a recurring motif in literature, theater, and film. Historically, some women have cross-dressed to take up male-dominated or male-exclusive professions, such as military service. Conversely, some men have cross-dressed to escape from mandatory military service or as a disguise to assist in political or social protest, as men in Wales did in the Rebecca Riots and when conducting Ceffyl Pren as a form of mob justice.

Undercover journalism may require cross-dressing, as with Norah Vincent's project Self-Made Man.

One famous case of gender disguise was when Bernard Boursicot, a French diplomat, was caught in a honeypot trap (seducing him to participate in Chinese espionage) by Shi Pei Pu, a male Peking opera singer who performed female roles, whom Boursicot believed to be female. This espionage case became something of a cause célèbre in France in 1986, as Boursicot and Shi were brought to trial, owing to the nature of the unusual sexual subterfuge alleged. 

Some girls in Afghanistan, even after the fall of the Taliban, were still disguised by their families as boys. This is known as bacha posh.

Theater and performance
Single-sex theatrical troupes often have some performers who cross-dress to play roles written for members of the opposite sex (travesti and trouser roles). Cross-dressing, particularly the depiction of males wearing dresses, is often used for comic effect onstage and on-screen.

Boy player refers to children who performed in Medieval and English Renaissance playing companies. Some boy players worked for the adult companies and performed the female roles as women did not perform on the English stage in this period. Others worked for children's companies in which all roles, not just the female ones, were played by boys. 

Thus adult men play female roles in kabuki.

Dan is the general name for female roles in Chinese opera, often referring to leading roles. They may be played by male or female actors. In the early years of Peking opera, all  roles were played by men, but this practice is no longer common in any Chinese opera genre.

Women have often been excluded from Noh, and men often play female characters in it. 

Drag is a special form of performance art based on the act of cross-dressing. A drag queen is usually a male-assigned person who performs as an exaggeratedly feminine character, in heightened costuming sometimes consisting of a showy dress, high-heeled shoes, obvious make-up, and wig. A drag queen may imitate famous female film or pop-music stars. A faux queen is a female-assigned person employing the same techniques. A drag king is a counterpart of the drag queen – a female-assigned person who adopts a masculine persona in performance or imitates a male film or pop-music star. Some female-assigned people undergoing gender reassignment therapy also self-identify as 'drag kings'.

The modern activity of battle reenactments has raised the question of women passing as male soldiers. In 1989, Lauren Burgess dressed as a male soldier in a U.S. National Park Service reenactment of the Battle of Antietam, and was ejected after she was discovered to be a woman. Burgess sued the Park Service for sexual discrimination. The case spurred spirited debate among Civil War buffs. In 1993, a federal judge ruled in Burgess's favor.

"Wigging" refers to the practice of male stunt doubles taking the place of an actress, parallel to "paint downs", where white stunt doubles are made up to resemble black actors. Female stunt doubles have begun to protest this norm of "historical sexism", saying that it restricts their already limited job possibilities.

British pantomime, television and comedy

Cross-dressing is a traditional popular trope in British comedy. The pantomime dame in British pantomime dates from the 19th century, which is part of the theatrical tradition of female characters portrayed by male actors in drag. Widow Twankey (Aladdin's mother) is a popular pantomime dame: in 2004 Ian McKellen played the role.

The Monty Python comedy troupe donned frocks and makeup, playing female roles while speaking in falsetto. Character comics such as Benny Hill and Dick Emery drew upon several female identities. In the BBC's long-running sketch show The Dick Emery Show (broadcast from 1963 to 1981), Emery played Mandy, a busty peroxide blonde whose catchphrase, "Ooh, you are awful ... but I like you!", was given in response to a seemingly innocent remark made by her interviewer, but perceived by her as ribald double entendre. The popular tradition of cross dressing in British comedy extended to the 1984 music video for Queen's "I Want to Break Free" where the band parody several female characters from the soap opera Coronation Street.

Sexual fetishes

A transvestic fetishist is a person who cross-dresses as part of a sexual fetish. According to the fourth edition of Diagnostic and Statistical Manual of Mental Disorders, this fetishism was limited to heterosexual men; however, DSM-5 does not have this restriction, and opens it to women and men, regardless of their sexual orientation.

Sometimes either member of a heterosexual couple will cross-dress in order to arouse the other. For example, the male might wear skirts or lingerie and/or the female will wear boxers or other male clothing. (See also forced feminization)

Passing

Some people who cross-dress may endeavor to project a complete impression of belonging to another gender, including mannerisms, speech patterns, and emulation of sexual characteristics. This is referred to as passing or "trying to pass", depending how successful the person is. An observer who sees through the cross-dresser's attempt to pass is said to have "read" or "clocked" them. There are videos, books, and magazines on how a man may look more like a woman.

Others may choose to take a mixed approach, adopting some feminine traits and some masculine traits in their appearance. For instance, a man might wear both a dress and a beard. This is sometimes known as "genderfuck". In a broader context, cross-dressing may also refer to other actions undertaken to pass as a particular sex, such as packing (accentuating the male crotch bulge) or, the opposite, tucking (concealing the male crotch bulge).

Clothes

The actual determination of cross-dressing is largely socially constructed. For example, in Western society, trousers have long been adopted for usage by women, and it is no longer regarded as cross-dressing. In cultures where men have traditionally worn skirt-like garments such as the kilt or sarong, these are not seen as women's clothing, and wearing them is not seen as cross-dressing for men. As societies are becoming more global in nature, both men's and women's clothing are adopting styles of dress associated with other cultures.

Cosplaying may also involve cross-dressing, for some females may wish to dress as a male, and vice versa (see Crossplay (cosplay)). Breast binding (for females) is not uncommon and is one of the things likely needed to cosplay a male character.

In most parts of the world, it remains socially disapproved for men to wear clothes traditionally associated with women. Attempts are occasionally made, e.g. by fashion designers, to promote the acceptance of skirts as everyday wear for men. Cross-dressers have complained that society permits women to wear pants or jeans and other masculine clothing, while condemning any man who wants to wear clothing sold for women.

While creating a more feminine figure, male cross-dressers will often utilize different types and styles of breast forms, which are silicone prostheses traditionally used by women who have undergone mastectomies to recreate the visual appearance of a breast.

While most male cross-dressers utilize clothing associated with modern women, some are involved in subcultures that involve dressing as little girls or in vintage clothing. Some such men have written that they enjoy dressing as femininely as possible, so they wear frilly dresses with lace and ribbons, bridal gowns complete with veils, as well as multiple petticoats, corsets, girdles and/or garter belts with nylon stockings.

The term underdressing is used by male cross-dressers to describe wearing female undergarments such as panties under their male clothes. The famous low-budget film-maker Edward D. Wood, Jr. (who also went out in public dressed in drag as "Shirley", his female alter ego) said he often wore women's underwear under his military uniform as a Marine during World War II. Female masking is a form of cross-dressing in which men wear masks that present them as female.

Social issues

Cross-dressers may begin wearing clothing associated with the opposite sex in childhood, using the clothes of a sibling, parent, or friend. Some parents have said they allowed their children to cross-dress and, in many cases, the child stopped when they became older. The same pattern often continues into adulthood, where there may be confrontations with a spouse, partner, family member or friend. Married cross-dressers can experience considerable anxiety and guilt if their spouse objects to their behavior.

Sometimes because of guilt or other reasons cross-dressers dispose of all their clothing, a practice called "purging", only to start collecting the other gender's clothing again.

Festivals
Celebrations of cross-dressing occur in widespread cultures. The Abissa festival in Côte d'Ivoire, Ofudamaki in Japan, and Kottankulangara Festival in India are all examples of this.

Analysis
Advocacy for social change has done much to relax the constrictions of gender roles on men and women, but they are still subject to prejudice from some people. It is noticeable that as being transgender becomes more socially accepted as a normal human condition, the prejudices against cross-dressing are changing quite quickly, just as the similar prejudices against homosexuals have changed rapidly in recent decades.

The reason it is so hard to have statistics for female cross-dressers is that the line where cross-dressing stops and cross-dressing begins has become blurred, whereas the same line for men is as well defined as ever. This is one of the many issues being addressed by third wave feminism as well as the modern-day masculist movement.

The general culture has very mixed views about cross-dressing. A woman who wears her husband's shirt to bed is considered attractive, while a man who wears his wife's nightgown to bed may be considered transgressive. Marlene Dietrich in a tuxedo was considered very erotic; Jack Lemmon in a dress was considered ridiculous. All this may result from an overall gender role rigidity for males; that is, because of the prevalent gender dynamic throughout the world, men frequently encounter discrimination when deviating from masculine gender norms, particularly violations of heteronormativity. A man's adoption of feminine clothing is often considered a going down in the gendered social order whereas a woman's adoption of what are traditionally men's clothing (at least in the English-speaking world) has less of an impact because women have been traditionally subordinate to men, unable to affect serious change through style of dress. Thus when a male cross-dresser puts on his clothes, he transforms into the quasi-female and thereby becomes an embodiment of the conflicted gender dynamic. Following the work of Judith Butler, gender proceeds along through ritualized performances, but in male cross-dressing it becomes a performative "breaking" of the masculine and a "subversive repetition" of the feminine.

Psychoanalysts today do not regard cross-dressing by itself as a psychological problem, unless it interferes with a person's life. "For instance," said Dr. Joseph Merlino, senior editor of Freud at 150: 21st Century Essays on a Man of Genius, "[suppose that]...I'm a cross-dresser and I don't want to keep it confined to my circle of friends, or my party circle, and I want to take that to my wife and I don't understand why she doesn't accept it, or I take it to my office and I don't understand why they don't accept it, then it's become a problem because it's interfering with my relationships and environment."

Cross-dressing in the 21st century

Fashion trends 

Cross-dressing today is much more common and normalized thanks to trends such as camp fashion and androgynous fashion. These trends have long histories but have recently been popularized thanks to major designers, fashion media, and celebrities today. 
Camp is a style of fashion that has had a long history extending all the way back to the Victorian era to the modern era. During the Victorian era up until the mid-20th century, it was defined as an exaggerated and flamboyant style of dressing. This was typically associated with ideas of effeminacy, de-masculization, and homosexuality. As the trend entered the 20th century, it also developed an association with a lack of conduct, creating the connotation that those who engaged in Camp are unrefined, improper, distasteful, and, essentially, undignified. Though this was its former understanding, Camp has now developed a new role in the fashion industry. It is considered a fashion style that has “failed seriousness” and has instead become a fun way of self-expression. Thanks to its integration with high fashion and extravagance, Camp is now seen as a high art form of absurdity: including loud, vibrant, bold, fun, and empty frivolity.

Camp is often used in drag culture as a method of exaggerating or inversing traditional conceptions of what it means to be feminine. In actuality, the QTPOC community has had a large impact on Camp. This is exhibited by ballroom culture, camp/glamour queens, Black '70s funk, Caribbean Carnival costumes, Blaxploitation movies, "pimp/player fashion", and more. This notion has also been materialized by camp icons such as Josephine Baker and RuPaul.

Androgynous fashion is described as neither masculine nor feminine rather it is the embodiment of a gender inclusive and sexually neutral fashion of expression. The general understanding of androgynous fashion is mixing both masculine and feminine pieces with the goal of producing a look that has no visual differentiations between one gender or another. This look is achieved by masking the general body so that one cannot identify the biological sex of an individual given the silhouette of the clothing pieces: Therefore, many androgynous looks include looser, baggier clothing that can conceal curves in the female body or using more “feminine” fabrics and prints for men.

Both of these style forms have been normalized and popularized by celebrities such as Harry Styles, Timothée Chalamet, Billie Eilish, Princess Diana, and more. These styles have also been adopted by fashion designers as well including Telfar, One DNA, Toogood, and more.

Societal changes 
Beyond fashion, cross-dressing in non-Western countries have not fully outgrown the negative connotations that is has in the West. For instance, many Eastern and Southeastern Asian countries have a narrative of discrimination and stigma against LGBTQ and cross-dressing individuals. This is especially evident in the post-pandemic world. During this time, it was clear to see the failures of these governments to provide sufficient support to these individuals due to a lack of legal services, lack of job opportunity, and more. For instance, to be able to receive government aid, these individuals need to be able to quickly change their legal name, gender, and other information on official ID documents. This fault augmented the challenges of income loss, food insecurity, safe housing, healthcare, and more for many trans and cross-dressing individuals. This was especially pertinent as many of these individuals relied on entertainment and sex work for income. With the pandemic removing these job opportunities, the stigmatisation and discrimination against these individuals only increased, especially in Southeast Asian countries.

On the other hand, some Asian countries have grown to be more accepting of cross-dressing as modernization has increased. For instance, among Japan’s niche communities there exists the otokonoko. This is a group of male-assigned individuals who engage in female cross-dressing as a form of gender expression. This trend originated with manga and grew with an increase in maid cafes, cosplaying, and more in the 2010s. With the normalization of this through cosplay, cross-dressing has become a large part of otaku and anime culture.

Across media

Women dressed as men, and less often men dressed as women, is a common trope in fiction and folklore. For example, in Norse myth, Thor disguised himself as Freya. These disguises were also popular in Gothic fiction, such as in works by Charles Dickens, Alexandre Dumas, père, and Eugène Sue, and in a number of Shakespeare's plays, such as Twelfth Night.  In The Wind in the Willows, Toad dresses as a washerwoman, and in The Lord of the Rings, Éowyn pretends to be a man.

In science fiction, fantasy and women's literature, this literary motif is occasionally taken further, with literal transformation of a character from male to female or vice versa.  Virginia Woolf's Orlando: A Biography focuses on a man who becomes a woman, as does a warrior in Peter S. Beagle's The Innkeeper's Song; while in Geoff Ryman's The Warrior Who Carried Life, Cara magically transforms herself into a man.

Other popular examples of gender disguise include Madame Doubtfire (published as Alias Madame Doubtfire in the United States) and its movie adaptation Mrs. Doubtfire, featuring a man disguised as a woman. Similarly, the movie Tootsie features Dustin Hoffman disguised as a woman, while the movie The Associate features Whoopi Goldberg disguised as a man.

Medical views
The 10th edition of the International Statistical Classification of Diseases and Related Health Problems lists dual-role transvestism (non-sexual cross-dressing) and fetishistic transvestism (cross-dressing for sexual pleasure) as disorders. Both listings were removed for the 11th edition. 
Transvestic fetishism is a paraphilia and a psychiatric diagnosis in the DSM-5 version of the Diagnostic and Statistical Manual of Mental Disorders.

See also

 Androgyny
 Breeches role
 Breeching (boys)
 Cross-dressing ball
 Cross-gender acting
 En femme / En homme
 Gender bender
 Gender identity
 Gender variance
 List of transgender-related topics
 List of wartime crossdressers
 Otokonoko, male crossdressing in Japan
 Queer heterosexuality
 Sex and gender distinction
 Social construction of gender
 Sexual orientation hypothesis
 Transvestism
 Travesti (theatre)
 Tri-Ess
 Womanless wedding

Notes

References

Further reading 
 Anders, Charles. The Lazy Crossdresser, Greenery Press, 2002. .
 Boyd, Helen. My Husband Betty, Thunder's Mouth Press, 2003
 
 Clute, John & Grant, John. The Encyclopedia of Fantasy, Orbit Books, 1997. 
 
 
 "Lynne". "A Cross-Dressing-Perspective"

External links
 
 The Gender Centre (Australia)
 Crossdressing Support Group (Canada)

 
Clothing controversies